Dana Zátopková (née Ingrová , 19 September 1922 – 13 March 2020) was a Czech javelin thrower. She won the gold medal for javelin at the 1952 Summer Olympics (only an hour after her husband, Emil Zátopek, won the 5,000 m), and the silver medal in the 1960 Summer Olympics. She was the European champion in 1954 and 1958. She also set a world record in 1958 (55.73 m) when she was 35, making her the oldest woman to break one in an outdoor athletics event.

Zátopková and her husband were the witnesses at the wedding ceremony of Olympic gold medalists Olga Fikotová and Harold Connolly in Prague in 1957. Emil spoke to the Czechoslovak president Antonín Zápotocký to request help in Olga getting a permit to marry Connolly. While it is not clear how much this helped, they did receive a permit a few days later.

Achievements

References 
 Biography at zivotopisyonline.cz

External links
 
 
 
 

1922 births
2020 deaths
Sportspeople from Karviná
Czechoslovak female javelin throwers
Czech female javelin throwers
Olympic athletes of Czechoslovakia
Olympic silver medalists for Czechoslovakia
Olympic gold medalists for Czechoslovakia
Athletes (track and field) at the 1948 Summer Olympics
Athletes (track and field) at the 1952 Summer Olympics
Athletes (track and field) at the 1956 Summer Olympics
Athletes (track and field) at the 1960 Summer Olympics
European Athletics Championships medalists
World record setters in athletics (track and field)
Recipients of Medal of Merit (Czech Republic)
Medalists at the 1960 Summer Olympics
Medalists at the 1952 Summer Olympics
Olympic gold medalists in athletics (track and field)
Olympic silver medalists in athletics (track and field)